The Edward J. Schwartz United States Courthouse is a courthouse building located in San Diego, California. It is a courthouse for the United States District Court for the Southern District of California. The 103rd Congress designated the building under H.R. 3770 in 1994, which became Public Law 103-228. The Courthouse is one of the busiest federal court houses in the nation.  The courthouse is 895,000 square feet.

The building is named for District Court Judge Edward Joseph Schwartz.

On May 4, 2008, Rachel Lynn Carlock and her boyfriend Donny Love Sr. placed a backpack containing three pipe bombs at the front door. The bombs went off without injuring anyone and only shattering the doors to the courthouse.

A proposed annex grew to become an additional federal court building, the James M. Carter and Judith N. Keep United States Courthouse.

References

External links
 FBI

Buildings and structures in San Diego
Federal courthouses in the United States